Heptathela kimurai, the Kimura spider, or kimura-gumo (in Japanese), is an Old World spider, found primarily in Japan and named after Arika Kimura, who collected it in 1920. It belongs to the sub-order Mesothelae (primitive burrowing spiders) and can reach up to 3 cm in length. Its burrows are covered by a camouflaged "pill box" flap.

Like other species of mesothele spiders, the ancestral traits of the Kimura spider include central spinnerets and signs of segmentation on the abdomen. These features are not seen on mygalomorph and araneomorph spiders, thus studying species like the Kimura spider can shed light on the evolution of all spiders.

Although Kimura spiders lack venom glands, they still have strong chelicerae and can produce quite painful bites.

The word kumo in Japanese means spider. ("Gumo" is a variation in pronunciation due to a phenomenon known as rendaku.) The sub-order this spider is a member of, Mesothelae, is about 400 million years old, placing the kimura spider among the most primitive living spiders. Its spinnerets are located in the middle of the body, as opposed to the more efficient location in modern spiders at the rear of the abdomen. It fixes its eggs on the surface of its burrow with silk so that they are well protected. The spider also surrounds its tunnels with silk threads. When it sets out on a hunt, it pays out a line of silk behind it. This "lifeline" helps it in orienting itself.

Taxonomy
Heptathela kimurai was first described by Kyukichi Kishida in 1920, when it was placed in the genus Liphistius as L. kimurai. In 1923, Kishida erected the genus Heptathela for the species, as on re-examination he decided it was sufficiently distinct from spiders of the genus Liphistius. The species name kimurai honours the collector, Arika Kimura.

References

Tomo Kočar, Strah je okrogel in ima osem nog (The fear is round and it has eight legs), GEA 12 (2002) 7, pp 46 – 49.
Yoshikura, M. 1982. Kumo no fushigi (The wonder of spiders). Iwanami-shoten, Tokyo.

External links

Liphistiidae
Spiders of Asia
Taxa named by Kyukichi Kishida
Chelicerates of Japan